Hoyer Guitars is a German manufacturer of guitars.

History
Established in 1874 by Franz Hoyer in his workshop in Schönbach (now Luby in the Czech Republic). Hoyer began by making lutes and zithers, and then changed to  classic and folk guitars. The company was continued by his son Joseph Hoyer. In 1945 the family left Schönbach and settled in Tennenlohe near Erlangen in Bavaria, Germany. Joseph Hoyer's son Arnold reorganised the Hoyer company and the brand soon became known for its good quality. Among the most notable users of the Hoyer guitar was English guitarist Eric Clapton, who received an acoustic Hoyer guitar for his thirteenth birthday, but the inexpensive steel-stringed instrument was difficult to play and he briefly lost interest. Two years later Clapton picked it up again and started playing consistently. Following Arnold Hoyers passing in 1967, his son Walter took over the Hoyer company and focused more on electric and folk guitars.

References

External links 

Guitar manufacturing companies
Companies established in 1874
German brands
1874 establishments in Austria-Hungary
Musical instrument manufacturing companies of Germany
Companies based in Bavaria